is a 2017 Japanese romantic drama film directed by Takeshi Furusawa from a screenplay by Erika Yoshida, based on the manga series of the same name by Musawo. The film stars Aoi Morikawa as Aoi Nisaka, the lead heroine; Takumi Kitamura as Yūto Siba, Aoi's childhood friend; and Kanta Satō as Sōsuke Takachino, Aoi's arranged partner. Unlike the manga series, which features a love triangle between one boy and two girls, the film's love triangle involves one girl and two boys. The film was released in Japan on October 14, 2017. A visual for that film was unveiled on May 17, 2017.

Cast
 Aoi Morikawa as Aoi Nisaka
 Takumi Kitamura as Yūto Siba
Kanta Sato as Sōsuke Takachiho
 Nana Asakawa as Konatsu
 Momoko Tanabe as Akiho
 Rieko Miura as Nizaka Marie
 Shōzō Endō as Yoichi Nisaka
 Houka Kinoshita as Takuto Takachiho
 Hiroko Nakajima as Kasumi Takachiho
 Yōichi Nukumizu as Crepe Vendor
 Yoshimi Tokui as Prof. Daisuke Yotsuya

References

External links
  
 

2017 films
2017 fantasy films
2017 romantic drama films
2017 science fiction films
2010s fantasy drama films
2010s Japanese films
2010s Japanese-language films
2010s romantic fantasy films
2010s science fiction drama films
2010s teen drama films
2010s teen fantasy films
2010s teen romance films
Films about time travel
Films directed by Takeshi Furusawa
Films set in universities and colleges
Japanese fantasy drama films
Japanese romantic drama films
Japanese romantic fantasy films
Japanese science fantasy films
Japanese science fiction drama films
Japanese teen drama films
Live-action films based on manga
Science fiction romance films
Showgate films
Teen science fiction films